HMS Venerable (1899) was a member of the  of pre-dreadnought battleships built for the British Royal Navy. The Londons were near repeats of the preceding s, but with modified armour protection. The ship was laid down in January 1899, was launched in November that year, and was completed in November 1902. Commissioned that month, Venerable served in the Mediterranean Fleet until 1908, and was subsequently recommissioned into the Channel Fleet. Following a major refit in 1909, she served with the Atlantic and Home Fleets.

After the outbreak of World War I, she took part in defensive and offensive operations with the Channel Fleet, shelling German positions in Belgium through May 1915. Thereafter transferred to the Mediterranean, she saw service in the Dardanelles campaign in mid-1915, and then in the Adriatic through 1916. That December, she returned to England and was refitted as a depot ship in 1918. She was sold for scrap in 1921 and was ultimately broken up in 1922.

Design

The five ships of the London class were ordered in 1898 in response to increased naval construction for the Russian Navy. The design for the London class was prepared in 1898; it was a virtual repeat of the preceding , though with significant revision to the forward armour protection scheme. Rather than a traditional transverse bulkhead for the forward end of the main belt armour, the belt was carried further forward and gradually tapered in thickness. Deck armour was also strengthened.

She displaced  normally and up to  fully loaded. Her crew numbered 714 officers and enlisted men. The Formidable-class ships were powered by a pair of 3-cylinder triple-expansion engines, with steam provided by twenty Belleville boilers. The boilers were trunked into two funnels located amidships.

Venerable had a main battery of four  40-calibre guns mounted in twin-gun turrets fore and aft; these guns were mounted in circular barbettes that allowed all-around loading or elevation. The ships also mounted a secondary battery of twelve  45-calibre guns mounted in casemates, in addition to sixteen 12-pounder guns and six 3-pounder guns for defence against torpedo boats. As was customary for battleships of the period, she was also equipped with four  torpedo tubes submerged in the hull. The tubes were placed on the broadside, abreast of the main battery barbettes.

Service history

Pre-World War I
HMS Venerable was laid down at Chatham Dockyard on 2 January 1899, launched on 2 November 1899, and completed in November 1902. After many delays due to difficulties with her machinery contractors, HMS Venerable commissioned on 12 November 1902 by Captain George Edwin Patey for service as Second Flagship, Rear Admiral, Mediterranean Fleet. She left Chatham on 20 November, called at Sheerness to adjust compasses, and arrived at the Mediterranean the following month. In 1903, she had an experimental fire control system for evaluation. During her Mediterranean service, she ran aground outside Algiers harbor, suffering slight hull damage, and underwent a refit at Malta in 1906–1907. On 12 August 1907 she was relieved as flagship by battleship HMS Prince of Wales, and her Mediterranean service ended on 6 January 1908, when she paid off at Chatham Dockyard.

Venerable recommissioned on 7 January 1908 for Channel Fleet service. She paid off at Chatham for an extensive refit in February 1909, during which her 3-pounder guns were removed and a rangefinder was installed on her foremast. The refit complete, Venerable recommissioned on 19 October 1909 for service in the Atlantic Fleet. On 13 May 1912 she transferred to the Second Home Fleet at the Nore, and went into the commissioned reserve with a nucleus crew as part of the 5th Battle Squadron. In 1913, her anti-torpedo nets were removed and a pair of searchlights were installed on her forward bridge.

World War I
When World War I broke out in August 1914, the 5th Battle Squadron was assigned to the Channel Fleet, based at Portland. Returning to full commission, Venerable patrolled the English Channel, and on 25 August 1914 covered the movement of the Portsmouth Marine Battalion to Ostend, Belgium, In October 1914, Venerable was attached to the Dover Patrol for bombardment duties in support of Allied troops fighting on the front. She bombarded German positions along the Belgian coast between Westende and Lombardsijde from 26 to 30 October 1914 during a German attack on Belgian defences in the Battle of the Yser; she also served as the flagship of the Commander-in-Chief, Dover Patrol, Rear Admiral Sir Horace Hood, from 27 to 29 October. On the 27th, German field guns were moved up close to shore, which forced most of the light vessels to retreat, though the heavily armoured Venerable remained on station until reports of a German U-boat in the area prompted Hood to withdraw to Dunkirk. Venerable was back on station on 28 October, along with the gunboat  and three monitors, to blunt another German attack. By the end of the month, the flooding from the opened sluices around Nieuwpoort had blocked the German advance, diverting German attacks further inland, out of range of Venerables guns. The German guns along the coast had by this time been hidden, which made it far more difficult to engage them with naval gunfire, so Venerable was recalled.

On 3 November, she was detached to support East Coast Patrols during the German raid on Yarmouth, though she did not see action with German warships. The 5th Battle Squadron transferred from Portland to Sheerness on 14 November 1914 to guard against a possible German invasion of the United Kingdom. The squadron returned to Portland on 30 December 1914. Venerable, in company with the tender Excellent and escorting destroyers and minesweepers, again bombarded German positions near Westende on 11 March 1915. The bombardment was meant to divert German attention during the British attack at the Battle of Neuve Chapelle. She returned again on 10 May in an attempt to suppress German artillery that had been shelling Dunkirk, but German counter-battery fire prevented Venerable from dropping anchor or achieving any success.

On 12 May 1915, Venerable was ordered to the Dardanelles to replace the battleship  in the Dardanelles Campaign. She steamed to the Mediterranean with the battleship ; the British hoped to take advantage of the experience both ships' crews had gained in bombarding coastal positions in Belgium. From 14 August 1915 to 21 August 1915, she supported Allied attacks on Ottoman positions at Suvla Bay. By the 21st, weather conditions worsened significantly, preventing the ships from being able to observe targets. In October, Venerable arrived at Gibraltar for a refit. Emerging from the refit in December 1915, she transferred to the Adriatic Sea to reinforce the Italian Navy against the Austro-Hungarian Navy, serving there until December 1916.

Venerable then returned to the United Kingdom, arriving at Portsmouth Dockyard on 19 December 1916, where she was laid up. In February and March 1918 she was refitted there as a depot ship, and she moved to Portland on 27 March 1918 to serve as a depot ship for minelaying trawlers. She was attached to the Northern Patrol through August 1918, then to the Southern Patrol from September to December 1918. Venerable paid off into care and maintenance at Portland at the end of December 1918. She was placed on the disposal list there in May 1919 and on the sale list on 4 February 1920. She was sold to Stanlee Shipbreaking Company for scrapping on 4 June 1920, resold to Slough Trading Company in 1922, then resold again to a German firm in the middle of 1922. She was towed to Germany to be broken up.

Notes

References

Further reading

External links

 Maritimequest HMS Venerable Photo Gallery

 

Ships built in Chatham
London-class battleships
World War I battleships of the United Kingdom
1899 ships